Naphthalenesulfonates are derivatives of sulfonic acid which contain a naphthalene functional unit.  A related family of compounds are the aminonaphthalenesulfonic acids.  Of commercial importance are the alkylnaphthalene sulfonates, which are used as superplasticizers in concrete.  They are produced on a large scale by condensation of naphthalenesulfonate or alkylnaphthalenesulfonates with formaldehyde.

Examples include:
 amaranth dye
 amido black
 armstrong's acid
 congo red
 Evans blue
 suramin
 trypan blue

References

External links
 

Naphthalenesulfonates